The Federal Aviation Administration is an agency of the United States federal government.

FAA may also refer to:

People 
 Faa, surname or epithet of the family of the King of the Gypsies in Scotland
 Faà di Bruno, an Italian noble family based in the areas of Asti, Casale
 Félix Auger-Aliassime, Canadian tennis player

Organizations 
 Federación Agraria Argentina, an Argentine agrarian workers' trade union
 Federació Andorrana d'Atletisme, the governing body for the sport of athletics in Andorra
 Federação Angolana de Atletismo, the governing body for the sport of athletics in Angola
 Feildians Athletic Association, an athletic club based in St. John's, Canada
 Finland Steamship Company (Finska Ångfartygs Aktiebolag, FÅA)
 Fleet Air Arm, aviation component of the United Kingdom's Royal Navy
 Fleet Air Arm (RAN), the Fleet Air Arm of the Royal Australian Navy
 Food Addicts Anonymous, a twelve-step program for people with food addictions
 Forças Armadas de Angola, Angolan Armed Forces
 Foundation for Aboriginal Affairs, an organisation for Indigenous Australians, 1964–1977
 Fuerza Aérea Argentina, the Argentine Air Force

Science and Technology 
 Fatty acid amide, a family of biochemicals
 Fellow of the Australian Academy of Science
 Fetch-and-add, a special CPU instruction
 Formalin-acetic acid-alcohol, a solution used in fixing tissue samples

Other uses 
 FAA 81 (Spanish: , "Argentine Automatic Rifle"), also known as FARA 83
 Faranah Airport, Guinea (by IATA code)
 Federal Arbitration Act, a United States legal statute
 Félix Auger-Aliassime, professional tennis player
 FISA Amendments Act

See also 
 Faaa, a commune in the suburbs of Papeete in French Polynesia